Detective Inspector Humphrey Goodman is a character in the crime drama television series Death in Paradise, portrayed by Kris Marshall.

Goodman is assigned to Saint Marie after the murder of D.I. Richard Poole at the start of Series 3. Clues from Poole's investigation helped Goodman reveal the motive and the killer's identity; Goodman commented that Poole had 'solved his own murder.' Goodman stayed in Saint Marie after his wife Sally announced she would not be joining him on the Caribbean island. He became the chief inspector on the island, and took to Poole's old routine of announcing the murderer in front of all the suspects and his police team. He is very unorganized, often forgetting things or finding himself with nothing to take notes on; he enjoys Caribbean life much more than his predecessor. He has a talent for being able to solve murders instantly, looking at the meaning of small details, much like his predecessor. He fell in love with his detective sergeant, Camille Bordey, coming close to revealing his feelings for her. He attempted to prevent her leaving when she requested a job in Paris, but stopped himself. He shared a passionate kiss with her just before she left the island. He had a soft spot for her successor, Florence Cassell, often sharing jokes together. Goodman and Cassell dedicate a drink to Camille after their first solved case.

During the fifth season, a running sub-plot involved Goodman attempting to get a girlfriend, but his results were various degrees of failure until he ran into Martha, a woman who once ran a sandwich shop he frequented when he worked in London, in the season finale. In the sixth season, Martha returns to the island for a few weeks, but while she and Goodman enjoy their time together, she eventually returns to London to start her dream job at a new restaurant. When a subsequent case sends Goodman and his team to London to track their suspects, he is prompted to stay with Martha, nominating the recently widowed DI Jack Mooney – the team's London liaison for their latest case – as his successor in Saint Marie.

Goodman has been described as "awkward" and "accident-prone". Michael Hogan argues that "his bumbling and stammering resemble a Hugh Grant impersonation."

Spinoff
Goodman remains one of the series' most popular DI characters. On June 29, 2022, it was announced by the BBC that a spinoff had been greenlit, commissioned by the BBC and BritBox International. The series, titled Beyond Paradise, will "pick up Humphrey and Martha’s (Sally Bretton) story as they navigate a new life together in the idyll of rural Britain." The first episode was broadcast on BBC1 on 24th February 2023.

References

Fictional British police detectives
Fictional English people
Television characters introduced in 2014
Death in Paradise characters
Police forces of British Overseas Territories and Crown Dependencies